Pracetas (Sanskrit: प्रचेतस्)   is a term in Hindu mythology with a number of definitions:

 It is an epithet of Varuna. 
 It is a name of one of the ten Prajapatis, the son of Suvarna, a law giver. 
 It is the name of the grandson of the sage Marichi
 It is the designation for a group of beings in the Vedas
 It is the collective term for the ten great-grandsons of Prithu

Vedas
Pracetas are those which bring consciousness to the outside, through the development of the senses that are active as sensations. These senses are the five forces of mind, five different angles of reflection; their formation took place with the help of the Pracetas.

In the Rig Veda Mantra I.41.1 which reads:

यं रक्षन्ति प्रचेतसो वरुणो मित्रो अर्यमा |
नू चित्स दभ्यते जनः ||

The word, pracetas, refers to men of knowledge, the men who are learned and wise. but in the Rig Veda Mantra I.5.7 which reads:

आ त्वा विशन्त्वाशवः सोमास इन्द्र गिर्वणः |
शं ते सन्तु प्रचेतसे ||

 (गिर्वणः इन्द्र) Praise-worthy Lord ! (आशवः सोमासः आ विशन्तु त्वा) Impatient seekers may enter Thee. May they (सन्तु शं) be gratifying (ते) to Thee, (प्र-चेतसे) the super-conscious Being.

This refers to the "super-conscious" being in whom it is prayed that the "impatient seekers" be allowed to enter (i.e. be merged with).

Puranas

According to the Puranas, Pracetas was a descendant of Druhyu; he was the son of Duryaman who was the son of Dhrita, the great-great-great grandson of Druhyu. Pracetas had one hundred sons who were the princes of the Mlechchhas, the barbarians of the north. Pracetas is one of the Prajapatis, and an ancient sage and law-giver. 

It is also said that there were ten Pracetas who were the sons of Prāchinabarhis and great grandsons of Prithu; according to the Vishnu Purana they had passed ten thousand years in the great ocean deep in meditation upon Vishnu who made them the progenitors of mankind.

As the story goes, the eldest of the ten sons of Prāchinbarhis, collectively known as Pracetas, became the ruler; they cleared forests and made land fit for agriculture; they married the daughters of Soma, who begot sons called Daksha Pracetas. There were 49 kings up to Daksha Pracetas. The Pracetas emerged from the ocean after their long sojourn to find the Earth covered by trees; they created wind and fire and destroyed the trees. Brahma, however, requested that they not do so, and solemnized their marriage with Marisha; it was their union that gave second body to Daksha Prajapati.

References

Rigveda
Hindu philosophical concepts
Puranas
Sanskrit words and phrases